Coelichneumon cyaniventris is a species of wasp belonging to the family Ichneumonidae. The species was first described by Constantin Wesmael in 1859.

Description
Adults can be found from June to September.

Distribution
This species can be found in Austria, Belgium, Czechoslovakia, Finland, France, Germany, Hungary, Ireland, Italy, Japan, Korea, Latvia, Luxembourg, Netherlands, Poland, Romania, Russia, Spain, Switzerland, Ukraine and the United Kingdom.

References

Ichneumonidae
Insects described in 1859